Miguel Ángel Mancera Espinosa (born 16 January 1966) is a Mexican lawyer and politician who works with the Party of the Democratic Revolution (PRD). He served as the Mayor of Mexico City from 2012 to 2018. Mancera graduated from the Faculty of Law of the National Autonomous University of Mexico (UNAM) in 1989, and he was awarded the Gabino Barreda Medal two years later for being the best student of his class. He has a master's degree from the University of Barcelona and the Metropolitan Autonomous University and a Juris Doctor from the UNAM.

Mancera has been a professor at several universities, including the UNAM, Autonomous Technological Institute of Mexico and University of the Valley of Mexico. In 2002, he began working as a bureaucrat when Marcelo Ebrard, the Secretary of Public Security of Mexico City, invited him to be his adviser. In 2006, Mancera became Assistant Attorney General, and from 2008 to 2012, he worked as Attorney General of the city. According to official reports, from 2010 to 2011, crime in Mexico City decreased by up to 12%. Mancera received several awards during his management as Attorney General.

In early 2012, Mancera became the candidate of the Progressive Movement coalition, formed by the PRD, the Labor Party, and the Citizens' Movement Party, for Head of Government of the Federal District in the 1 July 2012, elections. On 7 July 2012, Mancera became mayor-elect after he won with over 63% of the vote, and took office on 5 December 2012.

Miguel Ángel Mancera's administration as Mayor of Mexico City has been under scrutiny by his successor, Claudia Sheinbaum. During these investigations, different officials from his cabinet and from his close team as Head of Government of Federal District have been indicted, imprisoned or remain fugitives. In 2020 Mancera was disqualified from holding any public role in Mexico City for one year due to irregularities in 2018.

Early life and education
He was born on 16 January 1966, in the colonia (neighborhood) Anáhuac, located in the Miguel Hidalgo borough, in Mexico City. His father is the founder of the restaurant chain Bisquets Obregón. Mancera has four half-siblings: Ana, Miguel, Jaime and María del Carmen. When he was four, he lived in the Tacuba neighborhood, where he went to kindergarten. Mancera studied at Miguel Alemán Primary School and Secondary School 45, both located in Benito Juárez borough. He studied high school at Preparatoria 6, a high school that belongs to the National Autonomous University of Mexico (UNAM). According to Mancera, when he was a teenager he had a car accident, where another car crashed into his, and Mancera was the passenger. The public prosecution service asked Mancera to sign a document that exempted the driver of the car that caused the accident from liability. Mancera asked Victoria Adato Green, then-Attorney General of the Federal District, to pursue the case, assisted by consultor Diego Ramudia, and managed to fine the responsible driver.

Mancera decided to change his career to law. He attended the Faculty of Law of the UNAM from 1985 to 1989. His thesis, "La libertad por desvanecimiento de datos en el Proceso Penal y la Absolución de la Instancia" ("The progressive release of public data on criminal prosecutions and acquittals") won the Diario de México Medal "Los Mejores Estudiantes de México" in November 1990. In November 1991, he was awarded the Gabino Barreda Medal by the UNAM Faculty of Law, for being the best of his class of 1989. Mancera earned his master's degree from the University of Barcelona and the Metropolitan Autonomous University, Azcapotzalco campus, and his Juris Doctor from UNAM, with honors, with his thesis "El injusto en la tentativa y la graduación de su pena en el derecho penal mexicano" ("Injustice and disparity in Mexican criminal sentencing"). His studies included a specialty in penal law at the University of Salamanca and the University of Castile-La Mancha, Spain, under the auspices of the Panamerican University, Mexico.

Early political career
Mancera has worked as a candidate attorney, lawyer, and adviser at several law firms, including García Cordero y Asociados and Grupo de Abogados Consultores. Mancera has been a professor at several universities of Mexico, including the UNAM, Autonomous Technological Institute of Mexico, University of the Valley of Mexico, Panamerican University, Autonomous University of Aguascalientes, and Autonomous University of Baja California. In 2002, Mancera was a review committee member of the Criminal Procedure Code for the Federal District, and around the same time, he began working in government after Marcelo Ebrard, Mexico City's Secretary of Public Security, invited him to be his adviser. After Andrés Manuel López Obrador, the mayor of Mexico City, named Ebrard as Social Development Secretary of the city, Mancera was assigned Legal Director of the Social Development Secretariat. In 2006, Mancera was named Assistant Attorney General of Mexico City.

On 8 July 2008, Mancera was named Attorney General of Mexico City, after Rodolfo Félix Cárdenas was dismissed from office because of the News Divine Bar incident, in which nine teenagers and three police officers died in a botched police raid. According to official reports, from 2010 to 2011 crime in Mexico City decreased by 12%, while the national crime rate rose 10.4%. During this time, 179 street gangs with 706 members were disbanded, and kidnappings decreased 61%.

Mayor of Mexico City

On 6 January 2012, Mancera resigned as attorney general to become candidate for the Head of Government in the 1 July 2012 election. Jesús Rodríguez Almeida took his place as Attorney General. On 8 January, Mancera registered as a precandidate for Mayor of Mexico City, as a member of the PRD. On 19 January, he became the official Party of the Democratic Revolution (PRD) candidate for Mayor of Mexico City, running against Alejandra Barrales, Gerardo Fernández Noroña, Martí Batres and Joel Ortega Cuevas, representing the leftist Progressive Movement coalition, which is formed by the PRD party, the Labor Party, and the Citizen's Movement Party. The adversaries of Mancera were Beatriz Paredes Rangel, for the Commitment to Mexico coalition, an alliance of political parties Institutional Revolutionary Party (PRI) and Ecologist Green Party of Mexico (PVEM), Isabel Miranda de Wallace for the National Action Party (PAN), and Rosario Guerra for the New Alliance Party (PANAL). According to surveys made in late January, Mancera was between 18 and 30 points ahead of Paredes. However, the following month, electoral preferences that favored him decreased by nine points. Electoral preference for Mancera then increased from 36% in March to 41% in April in an El Universal daily poll. In May, Mancera favorability increased to 57.5%; in the same month, Adolfo Hellmund, Luis Mandoki, and Costa Bonino, in the house of Luis Creel, borrowed six million dollars on behalf of Mancera and López Obrador, but both politicians disassociated themselves from the incident, and Mancera filed a complaint against the people responsible for using his name without authorization with the Attorney General of Mexico City.

As candidate, the proposals of Mancera included to continue Ebrard's policies, an increase of 13,000 to 20,000 safety cameras, a reduction of car travel time, the expansion of the Mexico City Metro 12 line, a review of the issue of solid waste, the minibuses will be removed from the streets, 18 water purification plants, a Green Plan, the replacement of garbage trucks to separate organic and inorganic waste, among others. On 1 July 2012, exit polls noted that Mancera was the presumed winner of the election, with a margin of 59.5–64.5%, and had approximately 40% more votes than the second-place candidate, Paredes. On 7 July 2012, the Federal District Electoral Institute (IEDF) announced Mancera as Head of Government-elect, endorsing him with a certificate; which he received on 8 October 2012.

Mancera assumed office on 5 December 2012, as the sixth Mayor of Mexico City. On 24 December 2012, Mancera began a voluntary disarmament campaign in Iztapalapa borough, in return people who participated would receive money, tablet computers, and home appliance; small arms and grenades were exchanged. The program was applied to all Mexico City's boroughs during 2013, 2014, and 2015.

On 7 April 2013, Mexican actress Laura Zapata asked Mancera to help her son, whose car had been crashed and the responsible escaped. Mancera asked Rodolfo Ríos, then-Attorney General of Mexico City, to take the case. Because of this, he was criticized by Twitter users because of "selectively attending requests from citizens." In November 2013, Mancera announced the increase of the Mexico City Metro fare, from three pesos to five, per travel. According to the Metro operator, Sistema Transporte Colectivo, with the increase the system would use the earnings for several uses, including the improvement of the infrastructure and maintainment of its 12 lines and its 195 stations. The decision was criticized by sectors of the city population because its increase would represent a "blow up in the economy" of the inhabitants, as the minimum wage in Mexico City  was 64.76 pesos, as of January 2013. Mancera announced three opinion poll companies would ask to 7,200 Metro users if the fare should be increased, polling from 28 November to 2 December; the respondents represented less than the 1% of the 5.5 million daily users who use the system. According to the results from the companies Parametría (with 53.3%), Consulta Mitofsky (with 56.2%) and Covarrubias y Asociados (with 57.6%), the increment was approved to be applied since 13 December. Due to this, through the Movimiento Pos Me Salto, users called to civil disobedience protests by jumping over the turnstiles. However, Mexico City Government announced they would take legal actions against those who skip them.

Investigations of Miguel Ángel Mancera's administration 
They included the prosecution of various crimes and administrative offenses that were allegedly done in Mancera's administration, as well as to some close collaborators. Among those who have been investigated or sanctioned include:

 Miguel Ángel Vázquez Reyes, former undersecretary of Human Capital of the Secretariat of Finance of Mexico City and former Head of Staff of Mancera. Vázquez was accused of various alleged budgetary deviations associated with the management of personnel in Mexico City public administration. He was arrested in February 2020. As part of the investigation into these alleged deviations was imprisoned Berenice Guerrero Hernández, former Undersecretary of Financial Planning of the Mexico City Secretariat of Finance also Hedilberto Chávez Gerónimo, Cynthia Campos Fernández, Joel Pozol, Takahashi Villanueva, José Iván Morales Palafox and Gabriel Rincón Hernández, public servants from the same secretariat.
 Luis Serna Chávez, former private secretary of Mancera. The Attorney General of Mexico conducted a search of a home associated with him. Journal reports indicate a "boom" of real estate purchases by Serna, his wife and his brother, Julio César Serna, during his time as collaborators of Mancera. Also, the use of a credit card by Serna allegedly given by a contractor of the government of Mexico City.
 Felipe de Jesús Gutiérrez, former secretary of Urban Development and Housing (Seduvi) in the administration of Mancera. He is accused of improper authorization of 40 million pesos in reconstruction works after the Mexico 19 September 2017 earthquake. Gutiérrez sought to protect himself against the arrest but a judge denied it, so the former official remains a fugitive.
 Edgar Tungüi Rodríguez, former Secretary of Works for the capital and former Commissioner for Reconstruction of Mexico City. He is accused of the alleged illegal authorization of 40 million pesos in reconstruction works after the Mexico 19 September 2017 earthquake. Since 2019 he still a fugitive. As Felipe de Jesús Gutiérrez, Tungüi has an arrest warrant by the Interpol requested by the Mexico City Prosecutor Office.
 Jorge Eduardo Herrera González, former general director of Civil Works Construction of the Mexico City Secretariat of Works and Services, arrested in October 2020. He is accused of irregularities in the demolition of buildings after the 2017 earthquake.
 Edgar Amador González Rojas, former Secretary of Finance. Accused of irregularities in the management of resources donated for the 2017 earthquake, he was disqualified from holding any public role in Mexico City. The Attorney General of Mexico (FGR) confiscated his apartment and three bank accounts on December 22, 2020.
 Jaime Slomianski Aguilar, former secretary of the Urban Management Agency. Accused of irregularities in the management of resources donated for the 19 September 2017 earthquake, he was disqualified from holding public office in Mexico City.
 Francisco Alejandro García Robles, former director of Instruments for Urban Development in the Ministry of Urban Development and Housing (Seduvi). He was arrested in Acapulco for his probable participation in the crime of illegal use of powers and powers registered in 2017. He is said to have illegally allowed the construction of nine parking levels in a building in addition to the 21 levels for habitations previously authorized.
 Martin Rodriguez Sánchez, president of Consejo Internacional de Empresarios (COINE); assassinated January 23, 2021. Rodriguez is accused of operating a shell company paid MXN $406 million by Mancera′s Finance Secretary to do tax work the government was capable of doing itself. Officials suspect his murder was related to the corruption case.

In 2020, 1,680 public servants were sanctioned by Mexico City Comptroller Office in different ways. On 5 October 2020, the Electoral Tribunal of the Federal Judiciary  (TEPJF, in Spanish) sanctioned Mancera with a one-year disqualification to any public role in Mexico City after determining that he promoted a presidential candidate, Ricardo Anaya, in 2018, while being Head of Government, and sanctioned by Mexican electoral laws.

Personal life
Mancera has been married twice. His first marriage was to a woman named Martha in the early 1990s, with whom he lived in civil union for a year. They divorced two years later, and after six years Mancera married Magnolia, with whom he had two children, Miguel and Leonardo. After a decade, he divorced Magnolia. Mancera has a daughter out of wedlock, but he has said the child's mother does not want Mancera to see her.  From 2008 to 2009, Mancera dated Alejandra Barrales, who was the president of the PRD party at that time, who intended on becoming the PRD candidate for Mayor of Mexico City in 2012.

In September 2007, two assailants on a motorcycle intercepted and attempted to rob him while he drove his BMW in Periférico Sur. His bodyguard intervened and shot one of the robbers, killing him.

In his spare time, he practices multiple sports, including Krav Maga, indoor cycling and weight lifting, hunting and aviation. On 31 October 2014, Mancera had a cardiac surgery because three months before a cardiac arrhythmia was detected. During the surgery, he had a cardiac perforation. He recovered two weeks later.

In 2008, Mancera received the Alfonso Caso Award, given by the UNAM Faculty of Law, for the most distinguished graduate of the doctoral program. In September 2011, he was awarded the Latin American Prize for Life and Security of Women and Girls in Latin America and the Caribbean. In October 2011, he was co-awarded the First Class Honor Star Medal, by the Police and Security Association, for "his international collaboration to search and locate suspected criminals, as well as cooperation for the exchange of information and training on security and law enforcement." In February 2012, UNAM's Faculty of Law awarded Mancera the Raúl Carrancá y Trujillo Medal for his "academic and professional trajectory".

Bibliography
 La Tentativa en el Código Penal para el Distrito Federal, una Nueva Propuesta (2003)
 La Comisión por Omisión en el Nuevo Código Penal para el Distrito Federal (2003)
 López Obrador Caso el Encino. Implicaciones Constitucionales, Penales y de Procedimiento Penal (2005)
 Caso el Encino ¿Delito? (2005)
 Nuevo Código para el Distrito Federal Comentado, Tomo III (2006)
 Estudios Jurídicos en Homenaje a Olga Islas de González Mariscal, Tomo II (2007)
 Estudios Jurídicos en Homenaje al Dr. Ricardo Franco Guzmán (2008)
 Derecho Penal, Especialidad y Orgullo Universitario Papel del Abogado (2011)
 Derecho Penal del enemigo (2011)
 El Tipo de la Tentativa: Teoría y Práctica (2012)

See also
 Ministry of Public Security (Mexico City)

Notes
A  Although Mancera has worked under the PRD administration, he has never joined the party.

References

External links
 
 City Mayors' Mayor of the Month for June 2013

 Profile of Miguel Ángel Mancera by CIDOB 

1966 births
Living people
Heads of Government of Mexico City
National Autonomous University of Mexico alumni
University of Barcelona alumni
Universidad Autónoma Metropolitana alumni
University of Salamanca alumni
Academic staff of the National Autonomous University of Mexico
Academic staff of the Instituto Tecnológico Autónomo de México
Academic staff of Universidad del Valle de México
Academic staff of the Panamerican University
Academic staff of the Autonomous University of Aguascalientes
Academic staff of the Autonomous University of Baja California
People from Mexico City
Senators of the LXIV and LXV Legislatures of Mexico